Regent's University London (formerly Regent's College) is a private university located in London, England. It is part of Galileo Global Education, Europe’s largest higher education provider.

Regent's University London was established in 1984 as Regent's College. It received taught degree awarding powers in 2012 and became a university in 2013. It is one of five private universities in the UK. The university has its campus in Regent's Park, Central London.

History 

In 1984 Rockford College, Illinois acquired the former South Villa Estate campus of the University of London's Bedford College in Regent's Park and named the new institution Regent's College. The site was originally leased by Bedford College in 1908, and a new set of buildings designed by the architect Basil Champneys was opened by Queen Mary in 1913. The buildings were modified and added to over the years, especially after bomb damage during the Second World War. Bedford College merged with Royal Holloway College (another college of the University of London) in 1985 and moved to Royal Holloway's campus at Egham in Surrey, vacating the premises in Regent's Park. Regent's College gradually expanded, and the European Business School London moved to the College campus in 1987.

In July 2012 it was announced that Regent's College had been awarded taught degree-awarding powers (TDAP) from 1 September 2012. Institutions that have degree-awarding powers in the UK are known as "recognized bodies" of which there are over 150. In February 2013 Regent's College agreed to acquire American InterContinental University London from Career Education Corporation. In March 2013 the UK's Department for Business Innovation and Skills announced that Regent's College had met the criteria to become a university. Regent's was awarded silver by TEF in the 2021 ranking.

Validation of research degrees (MPhil and PhD) was transferred from the University of Wales to the University of Northampton for students starting from September 2016. This followed the decision of the University of Wales to withdraw from validating other institutions as part of its merger with the University of Wales Trinity Saint David.

The university's taught degree awarding powers were renewed for a further six-year term in 2018, after which it is eligible for permanent degree awarding powers.

In September 2020, Regent’s University London was acquired by Galileo Global Education, joining Galileo’s network of 80 campuses and 42 institutions across 13 countries around the world. The network includes the Paris School of Business in France, Instituto de Estudios Universitarios in Mexico, Macromedia University in Germany, and Istituto Marangoni in both Italy and the United Kingdom.

Administration
Regent's University London is a company limited by share capital.

The Board of Directors is responsible for overseeing the strategy and goals of the University. The chair of the board is Nick Whitaker. Day-to-day operational management is delegated to the executive team, headed by the Vice-Chancellor and CEO.

Finances
In the financial year ended 30 June 2021, Regent's University London had a total income of £31.62 million and total expenditure of £28.98 million. 98% of the total income generated was from tuition fees, and 42% and 53% of total expenditure were for operational costs and staff costs respectively.

At year end, Regent's University London had total net assets of £24.924 million. Cash surplus for the period was £24.401 million.

Academics
Regent's University London offers a wide range of courses in business, liberal arts and fashion design and marketing.  As of February 2022, Undergraduate course fees range from about £18,500 to £21,000 per annum. Regent's University London had an average of 339 full-time equivalent staff during the year ended 30 June 2021, of whom 150 were academic staff and 189 were management and administration staff.

Student body
Regent's University London currently has around 2,171 full-time students.

The University has an international student body with students coming from 140 countries overall. Fifteen percent of Regent's students are from Britain. Another forty percent come from the European Union. Fifteen percent of the students come from the US.

The Regent's University Student Union organises a range of clubs and societies, including Polo Club, Finance and Investment Society and Model United Nations. The Union also organises the Students in Free Enterprise initiative.

Notable alumni
Javed Afridi (CEO of Haier Pakistan)
Sultan Sooud Al-Qassemi (Emirati commentator on Arab affairs and also a member of the Sharjah ruling family)
Anjum Anand (food writer and television chef)
Param Singh (Indian Actor) 
Michael Boulos (associate director of Callian Capital Group)
Mark Ehrenfried, (Pianist and composer)
Kathrine Fredriksen (Norwegian businesswoman. Board member of Norwegian Property)
Fabien Fryns (Belgian art dealer and collector)
Riccardo Giraudi (CEO of Giraudi)
Eleonore von Habsburg (Austrian fashion model, family member of the House of Habsburg-Lorraine)
Prince Konstantin of Bavaria
Sultan Muhammad V (former head of state of Malaysia)
Marta Ortega Pérez (Chair of Inditex)
Philip Ozouf (Treasury and Resources Minister in the Council of Ministers, Jersey)
Sharan Pasricha (Founder & CEO of Ennismore, owner of Gleneagles Hotel and The Hoxton)
Jetsun Pema Wangchuck (Queen consort of Bhutan)
Karl-Johan Persson (President & CEO of Hennes & Mauritz)
Sir Robert Paul Reid (former Chairman of the British Railways Board)
Lady Kitty Spencer (English fashion model)
Noelle Reno (fashion entrepreneur, television presenter and former model)
Ruby Wax (comedian and television presenter)
Elizabeth Yake (film-maker)
Zeeshan Siddique (Indian politician)
Upasana Konidela (Vice Chairperson of Apollo Life)

References

External links
Regent's University London website

 
Private universities in the United Kingdom
Education in the City of Westminster
Educational institutions established in 1984
1984 establishments in England
Regent's Park
Buildings and structures in Regent's Park
Universities in London
Universities UK